IMSS may refer to:
 Mexican Social Security Institute, (Instituto Mexicano del Seguro Social, IMSS, its Spanish acronym)
 Istituto e Museo di Storia della Scienza, now the Museo Galileo, a museum in Florence, Italy
 Integrated Maritime Surveillance Systems, an integrated network of coast-line radars by the Indonesian Navy
 InterScan Messaging Security Suite, an enterprise e-mail antivirus software, by Trend Micro